Sydney Peppitt (8 September 1919 – 25 December 1992) was an English footballer who played in the English Football League for Port Vale and Stoke City.

Career

Stoke City
Peppitt began his career with his local club, Stoke City and made his debut during the 1936–37 season. He impressed in a few appearances in 1937–38 and 1938–39 but found it difficult to break into the first team with Stanley Matthews occupying his position. His career was interrupted by World War II, during which time he played for Stoke and was also called up to the territorial army in Belfast and guested for Linfield. When League football resumed in 1946–47 he played in 29 matches scoring 12 goals as Stoke nearly won the First Division title, losing their must win match against Sheffield United 2–1. Peppitt remained in the side for the next two seasons before falling out of favour with manager Bob McGrory in 1949–50, making just nine appearances.

Port Vale
He was sold to local rivals Port Vale in May 1950 for a £4,000 fee. He started the 1950–51 season with the #8 jersey, but Walter Aveyard showed his quality to quickly win it back and deny Peppitt a place in the first 11. After picking up an injury in November 1950 he only played one more game before being released at the season's end. He moved on to Worcester City of the Southern League.

Career statistics
Source:

References

1919 births
1992 deaths
Sportspeople from Hanley, Staffordshire
English footballers
Association football wingers
Stoke City F.C. players
Port Vale F.C. players
Worcester City F.C. players
English Football League players
Southern Football League players
British Army personnel of World War II